Helcogramma williamsi is a species of triplefin blenny in the genus Helcogramma which is widespread in the western Pacific Ocean. It is found in rocky areas with sandy channels at depths of  It was described in 2012 from a type collected from Taiwan. The specific name honours the ichthyologist Jeffrey T. Williams of the Smithsonian Institution.

References

williamsi
Taxa named by Chiang Min-Chia
Taxa named by Chen I-Shiung
Fish described in 1993